Thomas Fitzsimmons (15 June 1872 – 1934) was a Scottish footballer. His regular position was as a forward. He was born in Annbank, Ayrshire. He played for Annbank (featuring for the village team at various between spells at other clubs), Celtic (playing a single trial match in the Scottish Football League – against Rangers), St Mirren, Glossop North End, Fairfield Athletic, Oldham County, Wigan County and two spells at Manchester United (then known as Newton Heath). His younger brother David, a half back, also played for Newton Heath, Fairfield and Wigan.

In 2021, his medal from the 1893 Manchester Senior Cup, believed to be the oldest such item relating to Manchester United to have been offered for sale, was auctioned for £24,000.

References

External links
MUFCInfo.com profile

1872 births
1934 deaths
Date of death missing
Scottish footballers
Manchester United F.C. players
Association football forwards
Footballers from South Ayrshire
Annbank F.C. players
Scottish Football League players
English Football League players
Celtic F.C. players
St Mirren F.C. players
Glossop North End A.F.C. players
Fairfield Athletic F.C. players
Oldham County F.C. players
Wigan County F.C. players